Bedřich Tylšar (born 9 July 1939 in Vrahovice, Prostějov, Czechoslovakia) is a Czech horn player and music pedagogue. He is the brother of hornist Zdeněk Tylšar, and a long-term member of the Czech Philharmonic Orchestra.

References

1939 births
Living people
Czech classical horn players
People from Prostějov